The Fédération nationale de la libre pensée is a French not-for-profit federation of local associations concerned with free thought.

It promotes humanist principles of free enquiry and tolerance on rationalist and scientific principles, and campaigns against dogmatism.

Action against the use of public funds for Christmas decorations
The Federation has brought legal actions under the 1905 French law on the Separation of the Churches and the State against the use of public funds on religious symbols, notably public installations of nativity scenes. In 2014, these actions resulted in the withdrawal of some installations on the principle of secularism, but the legal proceedings got nowhere.

Publications

See also 
 Anti-clericalism
 Irreligion in France
 Secularism in France

References 

Church–state separation advocacy organizations
Non-profit organizations based in France
Secularism in France
Secularist organizations
Separation of church and state
Skeptic organizations in France